Events in the year 2022 in Mongolia.

Incumbents 

 President: Ukhnaagiin Khürelsükh
 Prime Minister: Luvsannamsrain Oyun-Erdene

Events 

 19 September - Mongolia puts Khovd Province under quarantine after a case of bubonic plague was confirmed.
 5 December - 2022 Mongolian protests

Disasters 

 2022 Mongolian wildfires

Sport 
 2022 Judo Grand Slam Ulaanbaatar
 Mongolia at the 2022 Winter Olympics
 Mongolia at the 2022 Winter Paralympics

References 

 
2020s in Mongolia
Years of the 21st century in Mongolia
Mongolia
Mongolia